Devi Singh (born 10 August 1932) is an Indian former sports shooter. He competed in the trap event at the 1964 Summer Olympics.

References

External links
 

1932 births
Living people
Indian male sport shooters
Olympic shooters of India
Shooters at the 1964 Summer Olympics
Place of birth missing (living people)